Senator Crutchfield may refer to:

Johnnie Crutchfield (born 1947), Oklahoma State Senate
Ward Crutchfield (1928–2016), Tennessee State Senate